Blinded may refer to:

 Blinded (1997 film), a French romantic thriller by Daniel Calparsoro
 Blinded (2004 film), a British film by Eleanor Yule
 Blinded (2006 film), a Grenadian film by Anderson Quarless
 "Blinded" (song), a song by Third Eye Blind
 The Blinded, a Swedish melodic death metal band
 Blindness, the physiological condition of lacking visual perception

See also
 Blind (disambiguation)